Despicable Me is a 2010 American computer-animated comedy film produced by Illumination Entertainment (as its debut film) and distributed by Universal Pictures. The film was directed by Chris Renaud and Pierre Coffin (in their feature directorial debuts) and produced by Chris Meledandri, Janet Healy, and John Cohen, from a screenplay written by Cinco Paul and Ken Daurio, based on an original story by Sergio Pablos. The film stars the voices of Steve Carell, Jason Segel, Russell Brand, Miranda Cosgrove, Kristen Wiig, Will Arnett, and Julie Andrews. In the film, longtime supervillain Gru formulates a plan to steal the Moon. Meanwhile, he starts a family by adopting three orphan girls, and must decide where his commitments lie.

Despicable Me debuted at the Annecy International Animated Film Festival on June 9, 2010, and was theatrically released in the United States on July 9, by Universal Pictures. The film received positive reviews and earned $543.2 million worldwide, becoming the ninth-highest-grossing film of 2010. It was nominated for Best Animated Feature Film at the Golden Globe Awards, BAFTA Awards and Annie Awards. Despicable Me is the first entry in what would become the franchise of the same name, which includes five more films—Despicable Me 2 (2013), Minions (2015), Despicable Me 3 (2017), Minions: The Rise of Gru (2022), and Despicable Me 4 (2024).

Plot

Longtime supervillain Gru is outdone by an unknown rival who stole the Great Pyramid of Giza. Gru, his elderly assistant Dr. Nefario, and his army of Minions formulate a plan to steal the Earth's Moon. Dr. Nefario worries that the plan will be too expensive, so Gru applies for a loan from Mr. Perkins, the director of the Bank of Evil, who orders Gru to steal a shrink ray first. While at the bank, Gru meets Perkins's son, Vector, a budding supervillain who was responsible for the Pyramid heist. Gru and two of his Minions steal the shrink ray from a research base, only for Vector to intercept them and obtain it for himself.

After a series of failed attempts to steal back the shrink ray from Vector's fortress, Gru notices three orphan girls, Margo, Edith, and Agnes, being allowed into the fortress to sell cookies for Vector. Gru disguises himself as a dentist and adopts the girls; he later uses them to distract Vector long enough for him to steal back the shrink ray. Gru starts bonding with the girls after intending to abandon them at an amusement park. He later shows Mr. Perkins the shrink ray via video call just as the girls interrupt it, causing Mr. Perkins to refuse the loan. A heartbroken Gru tells the Minions that the bank ceased funding the project. The girls give him their piggy bank, and the Minions pool all of their resources to raise the funds needed for the project. Mr. Perkins informs Vector of Gru's possession of the shrink ray, prompting Vector to take action by kidnapping the girls. 

Dr. Nefario calculates the day when the Moon is closest to Earth, but it is the same day as the girls' ballet recital. Believing the girls are becoming too much of a distraction to Gru, Dr. Nefario calls the orphanage's owner Miss Hattie to take the girls back. Gru successfully shrinks and steals the Moon. In hopes to make it to the recital on time, Gru rushes back to Earth, but finds that the recital has already ended and learns of Vector's plot. 

Arriving at Vector's fortress, Gru surrenders the Moon to Vector, but he refuses to hand back the girls.  Gru determines to exact vengeance on Vector for their abduction by storming the fortress. In panic, Vector activates his escape aircraft. Meanwhile, Dr. Nefario and the Minions discover that the shrink ray's effects are temporary: the bigger an object, the faster it reverts to its regular size. Gru, Dr. Nefario, and the Minions rescue the girls before the Moon returns to its normal size and launches itself into orbit, with Vector stranded on it. Gru reclaims custody of the girls and they celebrate with a special ballet recital that becomes a dance party.

Cast

 Steve Carell as Gru, a longtime supervillain
 Jason Segel as Vector, an archrival of Gru who was responsible for the Great Pyramid of Giza heist
 Russell Brand as Dr. Nefario, Gru's elderly assistant
 Kristen Wiig as Miss Hattie, the orphanage's owner
 Miranda Cosgrove as Margo, one of Gru's adopted daughters
 Will Arnett as Mr. Perkins, the president of the Bank of Evil
 Julie Andrews as Gru's mom

Despicable Me voice cast includes Dana Gaier and Elsie Fisher as Gru's adopted daughters Edith and Agnes, respectively; and Pierre Coffin as the Minions, Gru's adorable and humorous henchmen, with Chris Renaud as Dave and Jemaine Clement as Jerry. Additionally, other actors voice their roles in the film: Danny McBride as Fred McDade, Jack McBrayer as a carnival barker and a tourist dad, Mindy Kaling as a tourist mom, Rob Huebel as an anchorman, Ken Daurio as an Egyptian guard, and Ken Jeong as a talk-show host.

Production

Development and writing 
To develop Despicable Me, Spanish animator Sergio Pablos pitched the idea about a main character having villainous attributes. Pablos brought his draft to producer Chris Meledandri, who founded his animation studio Illumination Entertainment after leaving 20th Century Fox Animation in early 2007; screenwriters Cinco Paul and Ken Daurio began reworking the script. Soon after he brought together Pierre Coffin and Chris Renaud to direct, with the Paris-based studio Mac Guff to handle animation. Coffin, who comes from Mac Guff, was recruited for his experience directing commercials for the studio, while Renaud was brought in for his animation experience in Blue Sky Studios. In November 2008, Illumination Entertainment announced the beginning of development on its first CG animated film and project, Despicable Me.

The language spoken by the Minions was invented by Pierre Coffin and Chris Renaud, the directors of the film. The language is sometimes nicknamed "Minionese".

Animation
Coffin, Renaud, and character designer Eric Guillon were responsible for creating the Minions. They did not exist in the original script until their addition during Despicable Me production. Initial designs for the Minions were humans and robots, before finalizing their appearances to small, yellow pill-shaped creatures. Renaud described the Minions as out of focus and "not very smart". The characters took inspiration from Oompa-Loompas in Willy Wonka & the Chocolate Factory (1971) and Jawas in the Star Wars franchise.

Music

Despicable Me: Original Motion Picture Soundtrack is the soundtrack to the film of the same name, and it was released on July 6, 2010. It features new songs from the film written and performed by Pharrell Williams and performances by Destinee & Paris, the Sylvers, Robin Thicke, and the Bee Gees.

Marketing and release
Universal Pictures partnered the film with licensing and promotional partners valued at $75 million for the marketing campaign. Additional marketing partners for the film included Airheads, Church's Chicken, Hungry Jack's, Color Me Mine, American Express, Kodak, IHOP, and Best Buy.

Despicable Me debuted at the Annecy International Animated Film Festival on June 9, 2010, followed by a premiere on June 27, at the Nokia Theatre in Los Angeles. The film was released in the United States on July 9.

Despicable Me was released on DVD, Blu-ray, and Blu-ray 3D on December 14, 2010. Physical copies contain behind-the-scenes featurettes, filmmaker commentaries, games, and three short films: Home Makeover, Orientation Day, and Banana.

Reception

Box office
Despicable Me earned $251.6 million in the United States and Canada and $291.6 million in other territories, for a worldwide total of $543.2 million. It was the ninth-highest-grossing film of 2010.

The film was released with Predators on July 9, 2010, Despicable Me earned $21.7 million on its first day. The film debuted earning $60.1 million from 3,476 theaters. Its second weekend earnings dropped by 42 percent to $32.7 million, and followed by another $24.1 million on the third weekend. Despicable Me completed its theatrical run in the United States and Canada on January 20, 2011 as the seventh-highest-grossing film of 2010 in this region.

Critical response
The site's critics consensus reads, "Borrowing heavily (and intelligently) from Pixar and Looney Tunes, Despicable Me is a surprisingly thoughtful, family-friendly treat with a few surprises of its own." Metacritic, which uses a weighted average, assigned Despiable Me a score of 72 out of 100 based on 35 critics, indicating "generally favorable reviews". Audiences polled by CinemaScore gave the film an average grade of "A" on an A+ to F scale.

Peter Travers of Rolling Stone gave the film three stars out of four, saying the directors were skilled at "springing surprises" from the writers' "ingenious" screenplay. Peter Debruge of Variety wrote, "Since villains so often steal the show in animation, Despicable Me smartly turns the whole operation over to megalomaniacal rogue Gru." Robert Wilonsky of The Village Voice wrote, "The result is pleasant and diverting, if ultimately forgettable, and it's one of the rare instances in the recent history of 3-D's resurrection as The Savior of Cinema in which the technology doesn't dim the screen or distract the focus." Christy Lemire of the Associated Press wrote, "Kids will dig it, adults will smile with amusement, and no one will be any different afterward than they were walking into the theater." Bill Goodykoontz of The Arizona Republic gave the film three and a half stars out of five, saying, "Neither as rich in story nor stunning in animation as Pixar offerings, Despicable Me instead settles for simply being goofy good fun, and it hardly seems like settling at all."

Carrie Rickey of The Philadelphia Inquirer gave the film two and a half stars out of four, saying, "Short, sweet-and-sour, and amusing rather than funny, Despicable Me can't help but be likable." Colin Covert of the Star Tribune gave the film two and a half stars out of four, saying "You'll probably leave the theater smiling, but don't expect to be emotionally engaged, Pixar-style. You'll be tickled, not touched." Claudia Puig of USA Today gave the film three stars out of four, saying, "A whip-smart family movie that makes inventive use of the summer's ubiquitous 3-D technology is something worth cheering." Tom Keogh of The Seattle Times gave the film three stars out of four, saying "Despicable Me appeals both to our innocence and our glee over cartoon anarchy." Ty Burr of The Boston Globe gave the film three stars out of four, saying, "Despicable Me has enough visual novelty and high spirits to keep the kiddies diverted and just enough wit to placate the parents." Roger Ebert gave the film three stars out of four, saying, "The film is funny, energetic, teeth-gnashingly venomous and animated with an eye to exploiting the 3-D process with such sure-fire techniques as a visit to an amusement park." Michael Phillips of the Chicago Tribune gave the film two and a half stars out of four, saying, "By taking the "heart" part just seriously enough, and in the nick of time, the movie saves itself from itself."

Kim Newman of Empire gave the film three stars out of five, saying, "It's no first-rank CGI cartoon, but shows how Pixar's quality over crass is inspiring the mid-list. Fun, with teary bits, for kids fresh and smart for adults." Kenneth Turan of the Los Angeles Times gave the film two and a half stars out of four, saying, "The film throws so much ersatz cleverness and overdone emotion at the audience that we end up more worn out than entertained." Stephen Whitty of the Newark Star-Ledger gave the film two and a half stars out of four, saying, "Unfortunately Despicable Me is just, predictably eh. And the one thing the larcenous Gru never steals is our heart." Ann Hornaday of The Washington Post gave the film three stars out of four, saying, "An improbably heartwarming, not to mention visually delightful, diversion." Rick Groen of The Globe and Mail gave the film four stars out of four, saying, "This animated thing pretty near out-Pixars Pixar." Mick LaSalle of the San Francisco Chronicle gave the film two stars out of four, saying, "When compared with the ambition and achievement of recent animated films, such as Coraline and Toy Story 3, Despicable Me hardly seems to have been worth making, and it's barely worth watching."

Bob Mondello of NPR gave the film an eight out of ten, saying, "It's all thoroughly adorable, and with an overlay that's nearly as odd as Carell's accent: Despicable Me looks a lot like other computer-animated pictures." A. O. Scott of The New York Times gave the film two stars out of five, saying, "So much is going on in this movie that, while there's nothing worth despising, there's not much to remember either." Kirk Honeycutt of The Hollywood Reporter wrote, "Despicable doesn't measure up to Pixar at its best. Nonetheless, it's funny, clever and warmly animated with memorable characters." Steve Persall of the Tampa Bay Times gave the film a B, saying, "Directors Pierre Coffin and Chris Renaud craft a fun stretch run, wrapping the story with warm, fuzzy funnies and nothing to suggest a sequel, which is probably wise." Tasha Robinson of The A.V. Club gave the film a B, saying, "Until the creep + orphans = happy family formula starts demanding abrupt, unconvincing character mutations, Despicable Me is a giddy joy."

Accolades

Sequels and prequels

Despicable Me was followed by Despicable Me 2 (2013), Despicable Me 3 (2017), and the upcoming Despicable Me 4 (2024). The first film's cast, including Carell, Brand, Cosgrove, Gaier, and Fisher, reprised their roles, alongside new characters voiced by Wiig, Steve Coogan, and Carell. Nev Scharrel was appointed to the role of Agnes in Despicable Me 3. Minions (2015) and Minions: The Rise of Gru (2022) preceded Despicable Me. The films chronicle the history between the Minions and Gru.

Video game
A video game based on the film, titled Despicable Me: The Game, was released in 2010 for PlayStation 2, PlayStation Portable and Wii. A Nintendo DS version was also released under the title Despicable Me: The Game - Minion Mayhem.

References

Citations

Works cited

External links
 
 
 

2010 3D films
2010 animated films
2010 comedy films
2010 computer-animated films
2010 directorial debut films
2010 films
2010s American animated films
2010s crime comedy films
2010s English-language films
2010s science fiction comedy films
3D animated films
American 3D films
American children's animated comic science fiction films
American computer-animated films
American crime comedy films
Despicable Me
Animated films about orphans
Films about adoption
American films about revenge
Films about size change
Films directed by Chris Renaud
Films directed by Pierre Coffin
Films produced by Chris Meledandri
Films produced by Janet Healy
Films scored by Heitor Pereira
Films scored by Pharrell Williams
Films set in 2010
Films set in California
Films with screenplays by Cinco Paul and Ken Daurio
Illumination (company) animated films
Moon in film
Universal Pictures animated films
Universal Pictures films